Point and Line to Plane is a 2020 Canadian dramatic short film directed by Sofia Bohdanowicz and starring Deragh Campbell. The film continues to follow the character Audrey Benac (originated in 2016's Never Eat Alone).

The film premiered at the Marseille International Film Festival in July 2020 and subsequently screened at the 2020 Toronto International Film Festival, the 2020 New York Film Festival, the Festival de nouveau cinéma in Montreal, and the Vienna International Film Festival, among others.

Plot 
Devastated after the death of a friend, a young woman (Deragh Campbell) attempts to extract meaning from this intense loss as she discovers signs in her daily life and through encounters with the art of Hilma af Klint and Wassily Kandinsky. Borrowing its title from Kandinsky’s 1926 book, Point and Line to Plane portrays the phenomenon of magical thinking endured during an individual’s journey to process, heal and document a period of mourning. As the woman peers deeper into the invisible, the resurrecting potential of perception helps illuminate the power of how we choose to look and, moreover, how we see.

Cast 
 Deragh Campbell as Audrey Benac

Production 
Campbell portrays Audrey Benac for a fourth time, having previously played her for Bohdanowicz in the films Never Eat Alone (2016),  Veslemøy's Song (2018), and MS Slavic 7 (2019).

References

External links 
 

2020 films
2020 short films
2020 drama films
Films directed by Sofia Bohdanowicz
2020s English-language films
Canadian drama short films
2020s Canadian films